Above the line may refer to:

Above the line (filmmaking), an accounting term used in film production to denote expenditures that occur prior to filming
Above-the-line deduction, a type of tax deduction in the United States of America
 Above the line (advertising), advertising involving mass media
A component of contract bridge scoring
The group voting ticket option in Australian elections 
Above the Line, the colloquial name for the Research and Development Expenditure Credit technology tax relief scheme in the UK

See also
Below the line (disambiguation)